Iskren Pisarov (born 5 October 1985) is a Bulgarian footballer who plays as a winger for Yantra Gabrovo.

Career
Pisarov played for Litex for two seasons but left the club by mutual consent in June 2018.

Honours

Club
 Beroe
Bulgarian Cup:
Winner: 2009-10

References

External links
 

1985 births
Living people
Bulgarian footballers
First Professional Football League (Bulgaria) players
Second Professional Football League (Bulgaria) players
FC Yantra Gabrovo players
PFC Vidima-Rakovski Sevlievo players
PFC Lokomotiv Plovdiv players
PFC Beroe Stara Zagora players
FC Lokomotiv 1929 Sofia players
PFC Minyor Pernik players
PFC Chernomorets Burgas players
SFC Etar Veliko Tarnovo players
PFC Litex Lovech players
Association football wingers
People from Gabrovo